Open Marxism is a school of thought which draws on libertarian socialist critiques of party communism and stresses the need for openness to praxis and history through an anti-positivist (dialectical) method grounded in the "practical reflexivity" of Karl Marx's own concepts. The "openness" in open Marxism also refers to a non-deterministic view of history in which the unpredictability of class struggle is foregrounded.

Overview
The sources of open Marxism are many, from György Lukács' return to the philosophical roots of Marx's thinking to council communism and from anarchism to elements of Autonomism and situationism. Intellectual affinities with autonomist Marxism were especially strong and led to the creation of the journal The Commoner (2001–2012) following in the wake of previous open Marxist journals Arguments (1958–1962) and Common Sense (1987–1999). In the 1970s and 1980s, state-derivationist debates around the separation of the economic and the political under capitalism unfolded in the San Francisco-based working group Kapitalistate and the Conference of Socialist Economists journal Capital & Class, involving many of the theorists of Open Marxism and significantly influencing its theoretical development. 

Three volumes entitled Open Marxism were published by Pluto Press in the 1990s. A fourth volume, again published by Pluto, appeared in 2020. The authorship of the latest volume showed how far the influence of Open Marxism has spread from Europe to Latin America. There, new open Marxist works are frequently published on the website Comunizar. Recent work by open Marxists has included a revaluation of Theodor W. Adorno. Those commonly associated with open Marxism include John Holloway, Simon Clarke, Werner Bonefeld, Ana C Dinerstein, Richard Gunn, Kosmas Psychopedis, Alfonso Garcia Vela, Sergio Tischler, Peter Burnham, Mike Rooke, Hans-Georg Backhaus, Helmut Reichelt, Harry Cleaver, Johannes Agnoli, Mike Neary, Adrian Wilding, Edith Gonzalez, Frederick Harry Pitts and Kostas Axelos.

Criticism 
Some critics  have alleged that open Marxism is too open and only loosely Marxist. A charge of 'subjectivism' and 'voluntarism' is sometimes levelled at open Marxism, though its authors, particularly John Holloway have responded to this. 

Others claim that open Marxist accounts tend to treat the national capitalist state abstractly, without reference to uneven and combined development and international forms of class struggle in the capitalist "world-system".

See also 
 Antipositivism
 Neo-Marxism
 Parametric determinism
 Post-Marxism

References

Further reading 
 Axelos, K. ([1976] 1961). Alienation, Techne and Praxis in the Thought of Karl Marx. Trans. R. Buzina. Austin: University of Texas Press.
 Axelos, K. (1984). Systematique ouverte (Open Systems). Les Editions de Minuit: Paris.
 Bonefeld, W., Gunn, R., Psychopedis, K. (Eds.)(1992). Open Marxism, vol. 1: Dialectics and History. London: Pluto Press.
 Bonefeld, W., Gunn, R., Psychopedis, K. (Eds.)(1992). Open Marxism - vol. 2: Theory and Practice. London: Pluto Press.
 Bonefeld, W., Holloway, J., Psychopedis, K. (Eds.)(1995). Open Marxism - vol. 3: Emancipating Marx. London: Pluto Press.
 Bonefeld, W., and Psychopedis, K. (Eds.).(2005). Human Dignity: Social Autonomy and the Critique of Capitalism. Aldershot: Ashgate Publishing Ltd.
 Clarke, S. (1983). "State, Class Struggle, and the Reproduction of Capital". Kapitalistate. Vol. 10 (11): pg. 118-33.
 Clarke, S. ed. (1991). The State Debate. London: Palgrave Macmillan.
 Cleaver, H. (1977). Reading Capital Politically. Austin, TX: University of Texas Press.
 Dinerstein, A., Garcia Vela, A. Gonzalez,E., Holloway, J. (2020). Open Marxism 4: Against a Closing World. London: Pluto. 
 Holloway, J., Matamoros, F., Tischler, S. (2009). Negativity and Revolution: Adorno & Political Activism. London: Pluto Press
 Holloway, J. (2002). Change the World Without Taking Power: The Meaning of Revolution Today. London: Pluto Press.

External links 
 Common Sense journal

Eponymous political ideologies
Marxist theory
Neo-Marxism